Roger Kwok Chun-on  is a Hong Kong television actor and former singer, who works for the TV station TVB. Kwok was born in Hong Kong, and his native family roots are in Zhongshan, Guangdong. He is one of the three actors who won Best Actor three times at the TVB Anniversary Awards.

Career
Roger Kwok has worked for TVB for many years, and received moderate fame in dramas such as Detective Investigation Files IV (1999), At the Threshold of an Era (1999-2000) and Law Enforcers (2002), but it was not until he played the role of the low-IQ Ding Sheung Wong (丁常旺) in the hugely popular drama Square Pegs (2002-2003) did he reach stardom, and went on to win Best Actor at the 2003 TVB Anniversary Awards.

After appearing in the moderately popular dramas Not Just a Pretty Face (美麗在望) (2003) and To Get Unstuck in Time (2004), Kwok reprised his role as Wong in the modernized version of Square Pegs, Life Made Simple, in 2005, which again was a huge success. In November 2005, Kwok won Best Actor for the second time. In 2008, he received rave reviews for his villainous role as Tong Lap Yin in Last One Standing, a role which left many viewers in shock over his transformation from good to evil. In December 2014, Kwok won his third Best Actor Award for another villainous role, this time as the barrister "Matt" Ko Chit Hang in the drama Black Heart White Soul. He has since matched Gallen Lo and Wayne Lai's record of winning 3 Best Actor awards.

Personal life
Kwok has five older brothers and three younger sisters. On 22 July 2006, Kwok married Hong Kong actress Cindy Au, his girlfriend of seven years, at Hong Kong Disneyland. Their son, Brad Kwok Ling-shan, was born on 23 March 2008. Their second child, daughter Blair Kwok Yee-nga, was born on 29 June 2011.

Filmography

Television dramas

Films

References

External links
 

|-
! colspan="3" style="background: #DAA520;" | TVB Anniversary Awards

|-
! colspan="3" style="background: #DAA520;" | TVB Anniversary Awards

|-
! colspan="3" style="background: #DAA520;" | TVB Anniversary Awards

1964 births
Living people
Hong Kong male television actors
TVB veteran actors
Hong Kong Christians
Hong Kong male film actors
20th-century Hong Kong male actors
21st-century Hong Kong male actors